United Nations General Assembly Resolution 47/1 was adopted on 22 September 1992 in support of Security Council Resolution 777. The resolution expelled Yugoslavia from the UN General Assembly.

Background

As a result of the disintegration of Yugoslavia, in April 1992 the Yugoslav government proclaimed the Federal Republic of Yugoslavia, comprising the republics of Serbia and Montenegro. In addition, the Yugoslav government declared that the Federal Republic of Yugoslavia was the successor state of the Socialist Federal Republic of Yugoslavia. The US government and the European Community conditioned the recognition of the federal republic to a number of conditions related to the war in Bosnia and Herzegovina, such as the withdrawal of the Serbian army from Bosnia-Herzegovina and the facilitation of humanitarian aid. In July 1992 an arbitration commission established by the European Community considered that the Federal Republic of Yugoslavia was a new nation but could not be considered a successor to Communist Yugoslavia.

In June 1992, James Baker (US Secretary of State) called for the expulsion of Yugoslavia from the UN as a punishment for the "outrageous, barbaric and inhuman" actions of Serb troops in Bosnia-Herzegovina. That call was part of an effort by Washington to brand Slobodan Milosevic (Serbian head of state) as an international outcast, a step that would open the door to international military intervention.

Reaffirming a number of resolutions on the subject, the Security Council, through resolution 777, considered that the nation known as the Socialist Federal Republic of Yugoslavia had ceased to exist and therefore recommended to the General Assembly to exclude Yugoslavia from General Assembly and to apply for membership in the United Nations.

Debate

At the time of the vote in the General Assembly, Yugoslav Prime Minister Milan Panic tried to prevent the resolution from being adopted, arguing that the Yugoslav government was doing its utmost to stop the war. Several countries, however, concluded that even if Panic was sincere about the search for peace in the region, his government had been unable to control the Serbian militias in Bosnia-Herzegovina. Alia Izetbegovic, president of Bosnia-Herzegovina, said: "I do not question [Panic's] intentions to try to influence Belgrade's politics, but I doubt if he has a chance to get anything."

The resolution was adopted with 127 votes in favor, 6 against, 26 abstentions and 20 absences, marking the first time in UN history that a country was expelled from the body, although South Africa was facing a similar punishment due to Apartheid since 1974.

The resolution in brief

The resolution considers that the Federal Republic of Yugoslavia can not "inherit" the post of Yugoslavia at the UN and that it must therefore apply for admission to the United Nations. Likewise, it must remain outside the work of the General Assembly.

At the request of the delegations of Bosnia and Herzegovina and Croatia, the UN legal counsel in a letter to the Secretariat stated that the resolution did not end Yugoslav membership. According to the letter, Yugoslavia would remain a member of the UN, except that it would be marginalized from the General Assembly.

Voting in detail

In favor

Afghanistan, Albania, Antigua and Barbuda, Algeria, Argentina, Armenia, Australia, Austria, Azerbaijan, Bahrain, Bangladesh, Barbados, Belgium, Belize, Benin, Belarus, Bolivia, Bosnia and Herzegovina, Brunei, Bulgaria, Burkina Faso, Bhutan, Canada, Cape Verde, Chile, Colombia, Comoros, Congo, Costa Rica, Croatia, Cyprus, Czechoslovakia, Denmark, Djibouti, Ecuador, Egypt, El Salvador, Estonia, Fiji, Finland, France, Gabon, Gambia, Germany, Grenada, Greece, Guatemala, Guinea, Guinea Bissau, Haiti, Honduras, Hungary, Iceland, Indonesia, Iran, Ireland, Israel, Italy, Japan, Jordan, Kazakhstan, Kuwait, Kyrgyzstan, Laos, Latvia, Liberia, Libya, Liechtenstein, Lithuania, Luxembourg, Madagascar, Malaysia, Malawi, Maldives, Mali, Malta, Marshall Islands, Mauritius, Mauritania, Micronesia, Moldova, Mongolia, Morocco, Nepal, Netherlands, New Zealand, Nicaragua, Niger, Nigeria, Norway, Oman, Panama, Pakistan, Paraguay, Peru, Philippines, Poland, Portugal, Qatar, Romania, Russian Federation, Rwanda, Saint Kitts and Nevis, Saint Vincent and the Grenadines, Samoa, San Marino, Saudi Arabia, Senegal, Singapore, Slovenia, South Korea, Spain, Sudan, Sweden, Suriname, Thailand, Trinidad and Tobago, Tunisia, Turkey, Turkmenistan, Ukraine, United Arab Emirates, United Kingdom, United States, Uruguay, Vanuatu, Yemen.

Against

Kenya, Swaziland (since 2018 renamed to Eswatini), Tanzania, Yugoslavia, Zambia, Zimbabwe.

Abstentions

Angola, Bahamas, Botswana, Brazil, Burundi, Cameroon, China, Cuba, Ghana, Guyana, India, Iraq, Ivory Coast, Jamaica, Lebanon, Lesotho, Mexico, Mozambique, Myanmar, Namibia, Papua New Guinea, Sri Lanka, Togo, Uganda, Vietnam, Zaire.

Absent

Cambodia, Central African Republic, Chad, Dominica, Dominican Republic, Equatorial Guinea, Ethiopia, Georgia, North Korea, Saint Lucia, Sao Tome and Principe, Seychelles, Sierra Leone, Solomon Islands, Somalia, South Africa, Syria, Tajikistan, Uzbekistan, Venezuela.

Consequences

The Serbs reacted with rebellion and despair to resolution, with Serbian nationalists blaming Panic. Serbian leader Radovan Karadzic said the resolution had no influence over the war in Bosnia because "Yugoslavia has nothing to do with that war."

The Federal Republic of Yugoslavia joined the UN in 2000.

See also
 Breakup of Yugoslavia
 Yugoslav Wars

References

External links
Text of the resolution

United Nations General Assembly resolutions
1992 in Yugoslavia
Yugoslavia and the United Nations